HD 175167 is a star with an exoplanet companion in the southern constellation of Pavo. It is too faint to be visible with the naked eye at an apparent visual magnitude of 8.01. The system is located at a distance of 232 light years from the Sun based on parallax measurements, and it is drifting further away with a radial velocity of 5 km/s.

This yellow-hued star has a stellar classification of G5IV/V, which, together with the star's absolute magnitude of 3.88, is consistent with a star that is in the early stages of evolving off the main sequence. It has a high metallicity and is spinning with a projected rotational velocity of 2.6 km/s. The star has 1.2 times the mass of the Sun and 1.75 times the Sun's girth. It is radiating 2.9 times the Sun's luminosity from its photosphere at an effective temperature of 5,635 K.

Planetary system
A Jovian planetary companion was discovered in 2010 by a team of the Magellan Planet Search Program, led by Pamela Arriagada. Since the inclination of the orbital plane was initially unknown, it was only possible to deduce a lower bound on the planet's mass. It is at least 7.8 times as massive as Jupiter. In a 2013 paper, Robert A. Wittenmyer and colleagues reviewed the data of this and many other systems with one or two planets for possible additional planets, but were unable to find any evidence of any. An astrometric measurement of the planet's inclination and true mass was published in 2022 as part of Gaia DR3, while another 2022 study found a different, lower true mass.

See also 
 HD 129445
 HD 152079
 HD 164604
 HD 86226
 List of extrasolar planets

References 

G-type main-sequence stars
G-type subgiants
Planetary systems with one confirmed planet
Pavo (constellation)
CD-70 01658
175167
093281